Ove Nilsson (13 November 1928 – 13 February 2013) was a Swedish rower. He competed in the men's coxed pair event at the 1952 Summer Olympics.

References

External links
 

1928 births
2013 deaths
Swedish male rowers
Olympic rowers of Sweden
Rowers at the 1952 Summer Olympics
People from Falkenberg
Sportspeople from Halland County